Weng Tak Fung (born 22 December 1962) is a Hong Kong fencer. He competed in the individual and team foil events at the 1988 Summer Olympics.

References

External links
 

1962 births
Living people
Hong Kong male foil fencers
Olympic fencers of Hong Kong
Fencers at the 1988 Summer Olympics
20th-century Hong Kong people